Barbara Sue Ryden (born May 2, 1961) is an American astrophysicist who is a Professor of Astronomy at Ohio State University. Her research considers the formation, shape and structure of galaxies. She was elected a fellow of the American Association for the Advancement of Science in 2016.

Early life and education 
Ryden studied physics and integrated sciences at Northwestern University. She moved to Princeton University as a doctoral student, where she worked alongside James Gunn. She was a postdoctoral research fellow at the Center for Astrophysics  Harvard & Smithsonian and Canadian Institute for Theoretical Astrophysics.

Research and career 
Ryden joined the faculty at Ohio State University in 1992. She studies the formation and shapes of galaxies. Her research made use of the Sloan Digital Sky Survey and various numerical simulations. She has shown that the galactic disks at the centre of spiral galaxies are more elliptical than circular.

Ryden has written several astronomy textbooks, including Introduction to Cosmology, Interstellar and Intergalactic Medium and Foundations of Astrophysics.

Awards and honors 
 1994 National Science Foundation National Young Investigators Award
 2006 American Astronomical Society Chambliss Astronomical Writing Award for her book Introduction to cosmology
 2016 Elected Fellow of the American Association for the Advancement of Science

Selected publications

Books

References 

1961 births
Living people
American women scientists
Northwestern University alumni
Princeton University alumni
Ohio State University faculty
American astrophysicists
American women academics
21st-century American women